Sorcar is the surname of:

 P. C. Sorcar (1913-1971), Indian stage magician
 Manick Sorcar, Indian-American artist, animator and engineer, eldest son of P. C. Sorcar
 Piya Sorcar (born 1977), Indian-American social entrepreneur and researcher, eldest daughter of Manick Sorcar
 P. C. Sorcar, Jr. (born 1946), Indian magician, son of P. C. Sorcar
 Maneka Sorcar, magician, daughter of P. C. Sorcar, Jr.
 Moubani Sorcar, Indian actress and painter, daughter of P. C. Sorcar, Jr.
 Mumtaz Sorcar, Indian film actress, daughter of P. C. Sorcar, Jr.
 P.C. Sorcar, Young (born 1950), Indian magician, son of P. C. Sorcar

See also
 Sarkar (disambiguation)